Sir Thomas Gates (fl.?–1622), was the governor of Jamestown, in the English colony of Virginia (now the Commonwealth of Virginia, part of the United States of America). His predecessor, George Percy, through inept leadership, was responsible for the lives lost during the period called the Starving Time. The English-born Gates arrived to find a few surviving starving colonists commanded by Percy, and assumed command. Gates ruled with deputy governor Sir Thomas Dale. Their controlled, strict methods helped the early colonies survive. Sir Thomas was knighted in 1596 by Robert Devereux, 2nd Earl of Essex for gallantry at the Capture of Cadiz. His knighthood was later royally confirmed by Queen Elizabeth I.

Third Supply and Bermuda
Gates was appointed by the Virginia Company of London, which had established the Jamestown settlement under a Royal Charter for the colonisation of Virginia. He had sailed for Jamestown in 1609, aboard the Sea Venture, the new flagship of the Virginia Company. The Sea Venture was part of the Third Supply, a fleet of seven ships, towing two pinnaces, which was intended to deliver new settlers and desperately needed supplies.

At sea, the ships of the Third Supply were separated by a three-day storm now thought to have been a large hurricane. The Admiral of the Virginia Company, Sir George Somers, had taken the helm to fight the storm, and deliberately drove the ship onto rocks to prevent its foundering. The rocks proved to be the reef line to the east of the uninhabited archipelago now known as Bermuda. The other ships went on to Jamestown, not knowing the fate of the Sea Venture.

The 150 survivors spent the next ten months in Bermuda building two new ships on which to complete the journey to Jamestown. Two factions developed, however, due to a dispute between Gates and Somers over who was now the superior. As an appointed officer for Jamestown, Gates felt he was in authority, now that they were ashore. Somers felt that he retained authority until the settlers, including Gates, were landed at Jamestown. The two new ships, the Deliverance and the Patience were completed and sailed for Virginia in 1610. They left two men (a third would be left when the Patience returned from Jamestown) to maintain their claim of Bermuda for England. The Charter of the Virginia Company would officially be extended to include Bermuda in 1612.

Ever since, Bermuda has also been known officially as The Somers Isles. Sir Thomas Gates left his own name on a part of the colony, Gates' Bay, where the survivors of the Sea Venture landed. The oldest surviving fort in Bermuda, built between 1612 and 1615, is known as Gates' Fort. Many scholars believe Gates' accounts inspired William Shakespeare's play The Tempest. Sir Thomas Gates had a cross erected before leaving Bermuda, on which was a copper tablet inscribed in Latin and English:

Virginia colony

On reaching Jamestown, only 60 of the 500 settlers previously landed there were found alive through the winter of 1609–1610 which became known as the "Starving Time". The condition of the settlement was so poor that on June 7, 1610, Gates decided to abandon the floundering settlement and return to England. However, the timely arrival of another relief fleet under Lord De La Warr gave the colony a reprieve. Gates' actions as governor were recorded by his secretary William Strachey, and were later published as the book A True Reportory of the wracke, and redemption of Sir THOMAS GATES, Knight.

After Samuel Argall kidnapped Pocahontas in April 1613, Gates was fearful of reprisal from Chief Powhatan, and turned the Algonquian princess over to Dale in Henricus. She met John Rolfe during her captivity three months later. Reverend Alexander Whitaker converted Pocahontas to Christianity. She adopted the name "Rebecca".

Gates would go on to establish at least three new forts along the James River, as well as blockhouses, a wharf, and a governors house. Gates would also lead an armed force against the Powhatans, defeating them, and was governor when Sir Thomas Dale established the first permanent English colony outside of Jamestown, called Henricus. Gates' actions caused him to be considered a national hero upon his return to England, something the Virginia Company badly needed due to their previous dip in investors. Gates was outspoken in support of future expeditions to the New World, and warned his superiors that the colonies would fail without proper supplies. In November 1619, the Virginia Company's new treasurer, Sir Edwin Sandys, praised Gates' "Wisdom, industry, and valour, accompanied with exceeding paines and patience, in the midst of many difficulties."

Death
Gates died in the Netherlands sometime before September 7, 1622. Sir Dudley Carleton was quoted, saying that Gates was "an ancient honest gentleman of this nation." Gates had five children at his death, Thomas, Anthony, Margaret, Mary, and Elizabeth.

Timeline
 November 16–17, 1585
Thomas travels with an English naval fleet under the command of Sir Francis Drake destroys the town of Santiago, in the Cape Verde Islands off the west coast of Africa.

 January 1–3, 1586
Thomas travels with an English naval fleet under the command of Sir Francis Drake sacks the port of Santo Domingo on the island of Hispaniola.

 February 9, 1586
Thomas travels with an English naval fleet under the command of Sir Francis Drake attacks Cartagena, on the Spanish Main, and his men go on to burn the Spanish settlement at Saint Augustine (in present-day Florida).

 1589
Thomas Gates edits and publishes A summarie and true discourse of Sir Francis Drakes West Indian voyage, an account of Drake's so-called American Armada, of which Gates is a veteran.

 1591
Thomas Gates accompanies Robert Devereux, second earl of Essex, to Normandy, where the earl, commissioned a general for the occasion, lends his army in support of Henry IV, the Huguenot claimant to the French throne.

 June 1596
An English fleet under the command of Robert Devereux, second earl of Essex; Charles Howard, baron of Effingham and England's Lord High Admiral; and Sir Walter Raleigh sacks the Spanish port city of Cádiz.

 June 1596
On behalf of Queen Elizabeth, Robert Devereux, second earl of Essex, knights Thomas Gates for gallantry after the English sack of the Spanish port city of Cádiz.

 1597
Sir Thomas Gates takes part in the Islands Voyage, in which an English fleet led by Robert Devereux, second earl of Essex, and Sir Walter Raleigh attacks the Portuguese-held Azores. The raid is unsuccessful.

 March 14, 1598
Sir Thomas Gates is admitted to Gray's Inn, one of London's Inns of Court.

 1599
Sir Thomas Gates enters public service at Plymouth, England.

 April 10, 1606
King James I grants the Virginia Company a royal charter dividing the North American coast between two companies, the Virginia Company of London and the Virginia Company of Plymouth, overseen by the "Counsell of Virginia," whose thirteen members are appointed by the king.

 November 1606
Sir Thomas Gates first meets Sir Thomas Dale in Oudewater, South Holland, where the two serve as infantry officers in the army of the States General of the Netherlands.

 April 24, 1608
The States General of the Netherlands grants Sir Thomas Gates's request for a year's leave of absence. Gates, who commands a company of foot soldiers in the Dutch army, is preparing for a trip to Virginia.

 May 23, 1609
The Crown approves a second royal charter for the Virginia Company of London. It replaces the royal council with private corporate control, extends the colony's boundaries to the Pacific Ocean, and installs a governor, Sir Thomas West, twelfth baron De La Warr, to run operations in Virginia.

 May—June 1609
The Virginia Company of London issues the colony's new governor, Sir Thomas Gates, confidential "Instruccions orders and Constitucions by way of advise sett downe declared and propounded to Sir Thomas Gates knight Governour of Virginia … for the Direccion of the affaires of that Countrey."

 June 2, 1609
The largest fleet England has ever amassed in the West—nine ships, 600 passengers, and livestock and provisions to last a year—leaves England for Virginia. Led by the flagship Sea Venture, the fleet's mission is to save the failing colony. Sir Thomas Gates heads the expedition.

 July 24, 1609
A hurricane strikes the nine-ship English fleet bound for Virginia on a rescue mission. The flagship Sea Venture is separated from the other vessels and irreparably damaged by the storm.

 Late August 1609
After being damaged by a hurricane, eight of nine English ships bound for Virginia arrive safely at Jamestown under the assumption that the flagship Sea Venture, carrying Captain Christopher Newport and Sir Thomas Gates, had been lost at sea. The news sends the colony into a political tailspin.

 November 1609
Powhatan Indians lay siege to Jamestown, denying colonists access to outside food sources. The Starving Time begins, and by spring 160 colonists, or about 75 percent of Jamestown's population, will be dead from hunger and disease. This action begins the First Anglo-Powhatan War (1609—1614).

 Winter 1609—1610
While the English colonists starve in Virginia, the shipwrecked crew and passengers of the Sea Venture make camp in Bermuda. They build two new boats, the Patience and Deliverance, from Bermuda cedar and the scavenged remains of the Sea Venture.

 February 28, 1610
Assuming that Sir Thomas Gates is dead, the Virginia Company of London commissions Thomas West, twelfth baron De La Warr, governor and captain-general for life. He departs for America a few weeks later.

 March 1610
Sir Thomas Gates, with the Sea Venture castaways on the Bermuda islands, executes the gentleman Henry Paine, who had planned to escape the island with stolen stores.

 May 21, 1610
Having been stranded in the Bermuda islands for nearly a year, the party of Virginia colonists headed by Sir Thomas Gates arrives at Point Comfort in the Chesapeake Bay.

 May 24, 1610
In Jamestown, Sir Thomas Gates issues the first orders to govern the surviving inhabitants of Virginia. The orders will be added to and published in 1612 as For the Colony in Virginea Britannia. Lawes Divine, Morall and Martiall, &c.

 May 24, 1610
The party of Virginia colonists headed by Sir Thomas Gates, now aboard the Patience and Deliverance, arrives at Jamestown. They find only sixty survivors of a winter famine. Gates decides to abandon the colony for Newfoundland.

 June 8, 1610
Sailing up the James River toward the Chesapeake Bay and then Newfoundland, Jamestown colonists encounter a ship bearing the new governor, Thomas West, baron De La Warr, and a year's worth of supplies. The colonists return to Jamestown that evening.

 June 10, 1610
The Virginia colony's new governor, Sir Thomas West, twelfth baron De La Warr, arrives at Jamestown and hears a sermon delivered by Reverend Richard Bucke.

 June 10, 1610
Samuel Argall and Governor Thomas West, baron De La Warr, arrive in Virginia just in time to prevent Sir Thomas Gates and the sixty-five colonists who survived the "Starving Time" of 1609—1610 from abandoning the colony for Newfoundland.

 June 12, 1610
In Jamestown, Governor Thomas West, baron De La Warr, confirms Gates's orders and issues additional orders of his own. The orders will be published in 1612 as For the Colony in Virginea Britannia. Lawes Divine, Morall and Martiall, &c.

 July 9, 1610
After the colonist Humphrey Blunt is taken by Indians and tortured to death near Point Comfort, Sir Thomas Gates attacks a nearby Kecoughtan town, killing twelve to fourteen and confiscating the cornfields.

 July 15, 1610
William Strachey completes a revised version of a letter about the Sea Venture shipwreck and the condition of the Virginia colony. Addressed to an anonymous woman, it will be published posthumously by Samuel Purchas as A true repertory of the wracke, and redemption of Sir Thomas Gates Knight (1625).

 July 20, 1610
Sir Thomas Gates leaves Jamestown for England, where he will use his story of the Sea Venture to advocate for the colony and spur further investment. Aboard ship with him are two Virginia Indians recently taken prisoner: the weroance, or chief, Sasenticum and his son Kainta.

 November 1610
In A True Declaration of the estate of the Colonie in Virginia, the Virginia Company of London, hurt by lack of investment, rebuts its critics and argues for continued colonization efforts. The report suggests that Virginia's survival has come through "the direct line of Gods providence."

 May 19, 1611
Sir Thomas Dale arrives at Jamestown. The colony's marshal, he assumes the title of acting governor in the absence of Lieutenant Governor Sir Thomas Gates and Governor Sir Thomas West, twelfth baron De La Warr.

 June 1611
Sir Thomas Dale leads a hundred armored soldiers against the Nansemond Indians at the mouth of the James River, burning their towns.

 June 22, 1611
Sir Thomas Dale issues military regulations under which his soldiers are to act while in Virginia, supplementing civil orders released in 1610. The combined orders are printed in London the next year with the title For the Colony in Virginea Britannia. Lawes Divine, Morall and Martiall, &c.

 August 1611
Sir Thomas Gates returns to Virginia at the head of an expedition that includes three ships, 280 men, 20 women, 200 heads of cattle, 200 swine, and various other supplies and equipment.

 September 1611
Sir Thomas Dale marches against Indians farther up the James River from Jamestown and establishes a settlement on a bluff that he calls the City of Henrico, or Henricus, in honor of his patron Prince Henry.

 December 1611
Captain Christopher Newport leads a return trip to England that includes the daughters of Lieutenant Governor Sir Thomas Gates. Their mother had died on the transatlantic voyage earlier in the year.

 April 1613
Samuel Argall uses his extensive knowledge of the Potomac River—northern Chesapeake area and its Indian population to kidnap Pocahontas while she is with the Patawomeck—an event that ultimately helps to bring the devastating First Anglo-Powhatan War to a conclusion in 1614.

 March 1614
Lieutenant Governor Sir Thomas Gates returns to England, leaving Sir Thomas Dale in command of the colony.

 1618
Sir Thomas Gates wins compensation from the States General of the Netherlands for the period he was in Virginia and absent from army duty.

 November 1619
In a speech before the Virginia Company of London's Quarter Court, the company's new treasurer, Sir Edwin Sandys, praises Sir Thomas Gates's "Wisdom, Industry, and Valour."

 1620
Sir Thomas Gates joins other Virginia Company of London "hard-liners," or those who favor a military-style government, in protesting the appointment of Sir George Yeardley as Virginia's governor. They consider Yeardley's policies to be too lenient.

 March–June 1620
Sir Thomas Gates sells 60 shares of his Virginia Company of London stock, collectively worth 6,000 acres of land. At his death he will still own 50 shares.

 November 3, 1620
King James I appoints Sir Thomas Gates to the Council for New England, a project of the Virginia Company of Plymouth.

 September 7, 1622
Sir Dudley Carleton writes a letter informing an English official of the death, in the Netherlands, of Sir Thomas Gates, describing him as "an ancient honest gentlemen of this nation."

 June 13, 1623
Thomas Gates, the son of former Virginia governor Sir Thomas Gates, is given administration of his late father's estate.

References

Source used: America: Past and Present (Revised Seventh Edition, AP* Edition).

Source used: encyclopediavirginia.org

External links
 Genealogy Magazine Bermuda’s Immigrants to the Colonies .
 Bermuda Online Bermudian Forts.
 Experience Bermuda Saint George's . 
 www.encyclopediavirginia.org

History of Bermuda
Colonial governors of Virginia
Shipwreck survivors
Castaways
Virginia colonial people
1585 births
1622 deaths
People from Jamestown, Virginia
English emigrants